Muryali or Muriali is a town and union council in Dera Ismail Khan District of Khyber-Pakhtunkhwa, Pakistan. It is located at 31°49'0N 70°54'0E and has an altitude of 164 metres (541 feet).

References

Union councils of Dera Ismail Khan District
Populated places in Dera Ismail Khan District